The Glendola Reservoir is a reservoir in the Glendola section of Wall Township in Monmouth County,
New Jersey.  It was built in 1965. The water from the Glendola
Reservoir is pumped to the Swimming River Reservoir where it is treated.
The Glendola Reservoir is managed by
New Jersey American Water Company and provides drinking water
for residents of Monmouth County.

There are two possible sources for the Glendola Reservoir, the Shark River and
Manasquan River, the selection of source is controlled by the New Jersey American Water
company as neither river flows into the reservoir and all water must be pumped
to the basin.

This Reservoir is completely restricted to any public activity.

References

Reservoirs in New Jersey
Lakes of Monmouth County, New Jersey
Wall Township, New Jersey